Earl Williams was the first Akron Zips men's basketball head coach.  In four seasons (1905 to 1908), he guided the team to a 23-20 record. 

Year of birth missing
Year of death missing
Akron Zips men's basketball coaches